Between the period of May 1990 to April 1991, an earthquake sequence occurred in the Department of San Martín, northern Peru. Three large earthquakes of magnitudes 6.6, 6.5 and 7.1 occurred in the same region, causing extensive damage. At least 189 people were killed in the earthquakes.

Tectonic setting
The coast of Peru lies a 7,000-km-long convergent boundary where the oceanic Nazca Plate subducts or dives beneath the continental South American Plate. The Peru–Chile trench marks the location where the two plates meet and converge. The rate of subduction at this boundary varies throughout its 7,000 km length; from 65 mm/yr in the north, to 80 mm/yr in the south. The presence of active subduction produces large earthquakes when elastic energy along the plate boundary (megathrust) is released suddenly after decades or centuries of accumulated strain. Earthquakes rupturing the megathrust are known as megathrust earthquakes; capable of generating tsunamis when there is sufficient and sudden uplift of the seafloor, leading to the sudden displacement of the seawater.

Shallow inland crustal earthquakes within the overriding South American Plate are caused by internal deformation of the crust within the Andes Mountains; formed by the ongoing convergence. It has been suggested that a large décollement beneath the range is the source of these earthquakes. The fold and thrust belt systems along the eastern foothills of the Andes are seismically active and produce thrust mechanism earthquakes. Normal and strike-slip mechanism earthquakes also occur within the shallow crust. Flat slab subduction beneath the Peruvian Andes also results in deformation of the South American Plate, contributing to this occurrence.

Earthquakes
All three earthquakes corresponded to high-angle reverse faulting at a shallow depth within the South American Plate. After the  6.6 in May 1990, strong aftershocks were reported, with the strongest measuring  5.7.

Impact
At least 6,000 homes were severely damaged by the earthquake of May 1990, and 135 people were killed. Majority of the structures that suffered damage were constructed from rammed earth and adobe. The town of Soritor was the most affected with 1,100 homes destroyed, or about 90% of the town. The collapse of homes killed many people living in them. An  5.5 aftershock on June 9, 1990, caused one death and destroyed 14 homes. In April 1991, two more earthquakes separated by hours caused further damage in the region. The largest shock measuring 7.1 killed approximately 53 people. A maximum intensity of VII (Very strong) was assigned to the earthquakes.

See also
List of earthquakes in 1990
List of earthquakes in 1991
List of earthquakes in Peru

References

1990 in Peru
1991 in Peru
1990 earthquakes
1991 earthquakes
Landslides in Peru
Earthquakes in Peru
Geography of San Martín Region
1990 disasters in Peru 
1991 disasters in Peru